Finbarr Patrick Kieran Bresnihan (13 March 1944 – 18 July 2010) was an Irish  rheumatologist and international rugby union player. 

Bresnihan was born in Waterford in 1944 and educated at Gonzaga College, Dublin before qualifying as a doctor at University College Dublin (UCD). He was married with a son and three daughters and died in 2010.

Medical career
After qualifying as a doctor, Bresnihan specialised in rheumatology at Guy's Hospital in London before working with Morris Ziff at the University of Texas Southwestern Medical School before returning to Ireland to set up a laboratory at the UCD Medical School and St. Vincent's University Hospital. During his career he wrote a number of papers, two books and contributions to works on rheumatology. In 1991 UCD created a chair of Rheumatology for Bresnihan and in 2009 he was honoured as a "Master" by the American College of Rheumatology.

Rugby career
Bresnihan was capped twenty-five times as a centre for Ireland between 1966 and 1971. He scored six tries for Ireland.

Bresnihan made two British and Irish Lions tours. He was called up as a replacement for the 1966 British Lions tour to Australia and New Zealand but did not play in any of the tests. He was also selected for the 1968 British Lions tour to South Africa and played in three of the tests against .

He played club rugby for University College Dublin, Lansdowne, London Irish, and Dallas Harlequins, and represented the Munster provincial team and the Barbarians invitiational team.

References

1944 births
2010 deaths
Alumni of University College Dublin
Barbarian F.C. players
British & Irish Lions rugby union players from Ireland
Ireland international rugby union players
Irish rheumatologists
Irish rugby union players
Lansdowne Football Club players
London Irish players
Munster Rugby players
People educated at Gonzaga College
Rugby union centres
Rugby union players from Waterford (city)
University College Dublin R.F.C. players